Labbra rosse is a 1960 Italian film directed by Giuseppe Bennati and starring Gabriele Ferzetti.

Plot 
Rome. The lawyer Martini discovers that his sixteen-year-old daughter Baby did not go by train to Rapallo as she had told her family. He then begins to investigate, but without informing his wife of her so as not to worry her. Martini approaches Irene, Baby's friend and schoolmate, who is not of much help to him; the man suspects, however, that Irene knows more than what she tells, and begins to frequent her circle to find out more. As the relationship between the mature lawyer and the young student becomes more and more intense, Martini discovers that his daughter Baby has just ended a relationship with a certain Giorgio Carrei, a forty-year-old architect already married.

Cast
 Gabriele Ferzetti	as Avvocato Paolo Martini
 Jeanne Valérie as Irene
 Giorgio Albertazzi as Giorgio Carrei
 Christine Kaufmann as Baby
 Marina Bonfigli as Signora Martini
 Laura Betti as Painter Girl
 Leonardo Porzio as Doorkeeper of Via Dalmazia
 Pino Colizzi as Employee of Carrei (as Giuseppe Colizzi)
 Elvy Lissiak as Secretary of Carrei
 Elena Forte as Mrs. Carrei
 Rita Livesi as Sister
 Gianni Solaro as Commissioner Pagano
 Nino Fuscagni as Ghigo (as Serafino Fuscagni)
 Fabrizio Capucci 
 Tullio Altamura as Hotel Doorman

References

External links

1960 films
Italian drama films
1960s Italian-language films
1950s Italian films
1960s Italian films